Vicente Mejía Colindres (6 April 1878 – 24 August 1966) was President of Honduras between 16 September and 5 October 1919; and again between 1 February 1929 and 1 February 1933.

A successful beginning to his presidency was dampened by the effects of the 1929 economic depression. He had been democratically elected in the 1928 elections that saw an almost unprecedented peaceful transfer of power from the incumbent to an opposition party, and the same was to occur in 1932 when Tiburcio Carías Andino won and succeeded him. He died on 24 August 1966 in Tegucigalpa, Honduras.

Notes

1878 births
1966 deaths
Presidents of Honduras
Liberal Party of Honduras politicians
People from Intibucá Department